Hot Country Songs is a chart that ranks the top-performing country music songs in the United States, published by Billboard magazine.  In 1976, 37 different singles topped the chart, which at the time was published under the title Hot Country Singles, in 52 issues of the magazine.  Chart placings were based on playlists submitted by country music radio stations and sales reports submitted by stores.

At the start of the year the song at the top of the chart was "Convoy" by C. W. McCall, its third week at number one.  The song remained in the top spot until the issue of Billboard dated January 31, 1976, when it was replaced by "This Time I've Hurt Her More than She Loves Me" by Conway Twitty.  "Convoy" also topped the magazine's all-genres singles chart, the Hot 100.  It was one of three 1976 country number ones to capitalize on the prevailing fad for citizens band radio (CB), along with "The White Knight" by Cledus Maggard & the Citizen's Band and "Teddy Bear" by Red Sovine.  CB also featured, to a lesser extent, in the song "One Piece at a Time", which was the final chart-topper for Country Music Hall of Famer and icon of the genre Johnny Cash.

C. W. McCall's total of four weeks at number one in 1976 was matched by Willie Nelson, who spent one week in the top spot with "If You've Got the Money I've Got the Time" and three with "Good Hearted Woman" in collaboration with Waylon Jennings, as well as by Tammy Wynette, who spent three weeks at number one with two solo singles and a further week at the top with "Golden Ring", a duet with her former husband George Jones.  The couple had divorced the previous year, but nonetheless continued to record together.  As well as Jennings, Conway Twitty, Marty Robbins and Red Sovine each spent three weeks at number one.  Twitty was the only act to take three different singles to number one in 1976.  Acts to top the chart for the first time in 1976 included novelty artist Cledus Maggard, who reached the number one position with his first ever Hot Country chart entry.  He would go on to enter the listing with three more singles but his chart career ended in 1978, after which Maggard (real name Jay Huguely) would concentrate on the field of television production.  Two female singers gained their first number ones via duets with established male vocalists: Mary Lou Turner with Bill Anderson and Helen Cornelius with Jim Ed Brown.  Vocal group Dave & Sugar topped the chart for the first time with "The Door Is Always Open", the third version of the song to chart in less than three years, but by far the most successful.

Chart history

See also
1976 in music
List of artists who reached number one on the U.S. country chart

References

1976
1976 record charts
Country